Super Bowl XXXVII was an American football game between the American Football Conference (AFC) champion Oakland Raiders and the National Football Conference (NFC) champion Tampa Bay Buccaneers to decide the National Football League (NFL) champion for the 2002 season. The Buccaneers defeated the Raiders by the score of 48–21, tied with Super Bowl XXXV for the seventh largest Super Bowl margin of victory, winning their first-ever Super Bowl. The game was played on January 26, 2003, at Qualcomm Stadium in San Diego, California.

To date, this is the last Super Bowl to be played in the month of January, as all subsequent games have been played in February. It is also the last to have been played in the week following the conference championship games (the others being Super Bowls XVII, XXV, XXVIII, XXXIV, and XXXVI) and the last to be played at Qualcomm Stadium, which previously hosted Super Bowl XXII (then called Jack Murphy Stadium) and Super Bowl XXXII and was demolished in 2021. Since the NFL no longer has a team in San Diego after the Chargers relocated to Los Angeles in 2017, and the league has a policy not to award Super Bowls to metropolitan areas that do not have a team within them, Super Bowl XXXVII will be the last to be played in San Diego for the foreseeable future unless an NFL team returns to the area. 

This was the first Super Bowl in which the league's number one-ranked offense (Raiders) faced the league's number one-ranked defense (Buccaneers). The game sometimes is referred to as the "Gruden Bowl", because the primary storyline surrounding the game revolved around Jon Gruden. Gruden was the Raiders' head coach from 1998 to 2001, and as a result of a trade then became the Buccaneers head coach in 2002. Tampa Bay, "Gruden's new team", made their first Super Bowl appearance in team history after posting a  regular season record. Oakland, "Gruden's old team", advanced to their fifth Super Bowl after an  regular season. Super Bowl XXXVII is also referred to as the "Pirate Bowl", due to both teams' pirate-themed mascots and logos. 

The Raiders came into the game as four-point favorites. However, offensive struggles from the Raiders, and a dominant defensive performance from Tampa throughout much of the game would unravel the juggernaut Raider offense. Oakland quarterback Rich Gannon threw a Super Bowl record five interceptions, three of which were returned for touchdowns. The Buccaneers also sacked Gannon five times, and scored 34 consecutive points to build a 34–3 lead late in the third quarter. Tampa Bay safety Dexter Jackson, who had two of those interceptions and returned them for 34 yards, was named Super Bowl MVP. Jackson became only the second safety and third defensive back named Super Bowl MVP.

Background
Super Bowl XXXVII was originally awarded to San Francisco on October 15, 1997 by the NFL owners at a league meeting in Washington, D.C. The 49ers had recently announced plans for a new stadium, and were awarded the Super Bowl contingent on its completion. However, the stadium plans had stalled by the fall of 1998 and the NFL reopened the bidding for the game. San Diego, which had lost out on Super Bowl XXXVI, announced its interest. The city was awarded the game during the May 26, 1999 meeting at Atlanta. Miami was the only other city in consideration. It was the last Super Bowl played in California until Super Bowl 50 at Levi's Stadium in Santa Clara. It was also the final Super Bowl at Qualcomm Stadium before the Chargers relocated to Los Angeles in 2017.

Later in 2003, California would host the Stanley Cup Finals with the Mighty Ducks of Anaheim hosting games 3, 4, and 6, making it only the second time that the same state hosted both the Super Bowl and the Stanley Cup Finals in the same year, following California itself ten years earlier, when the Los Angeles Kings went to the Finals four months after Pasadena hosted Super Bowl XXVII.  It was then succeeded by itself again in 2016 when Super Bowl 50 took place in San Francisco and the San Jose Sharks made the Stanley Cup Finals.

Jon Gruden helps rebuild the Raiders
After moving back to Oakland, California in 1995, the Raiders suffered sub-par seasons, including a 4–12 record in 1997. Under Gruden's leadership, the Raiders improved to 8–8 in both 1998 and 1999. The team was further boosted in 1999 with the signing of veteran quarterback Rich Gannon. With Gannon as quarterback, the team jumped to the fifth-best offense in the league.

The Raiders won the AFC West in 2000 with a 12–4 record and the best rushing offense in the league. However, they lost the AFC Championship Game to the eventual Super Bowl XXXV champion Baltimore Ravens, 16–3. After signing veteran Pro Bowl wide receiver Jerry Rice and defensive tackle Trace Armstrong, the team repeated as AFC West champions in 2001, but were eliminated in the AFC Divisional Game by the eventual Super Bowl XXXVI champion New England Patriots in what became known as the "Tuck Rule Game", in which a potential game-ending fumble recovery by the Raiders was overturned by instant replay.

Gruden is "traded" to the Buccaneers

Raiders owner Al Davis was known to have the lowest salaries for coaches in the league, and Gruden was no exception. Instead of paying a high salary for Gruden, Davis opted to trade the rights for Gruden to the Buccaneers in exchange for four draft picks, in a deal similar to what Patriots owner Robert Kraft made with the New York Jets to get head coach Bill Belichick in 2000. The Buccaneers ended up giving two first-round picks, two second-round picks and $8 million to the Raiders to get Gruden. Tampa Bay was desperate to have someone rebuild their offense so it would complement their powerful defense in an attempt to win the Super Bowl.

For most of their history, the Buccaneers were regarded as losers, making the playoffs only three times in their first 20 seasons. But that changed when the team hired Tony Dungy as head coach in 1996. Dungy, along with his defensive coordinator Monte Kiffin, rebuilt the defense around a core group of players, such as defensive lineman Warren Sapp, linebacker Derrick Brooks, and defensive backs Ronde Barber and John Lynch. By 1997, Tampa Bay ranked 3rd in the league in total yards allowed, 2nd in 1998, and 3rd in both 1999 & 2000.

With one of the best defenses in the league, Dungy helped guide the Buccaneers to four playoff appearances in his six years as the team's head coach. But the team always had one of the worst offenses in the league, and this was a major factor in their playoff losses. Thus, Dungy was fired and replaced by Gruden.

Still, even Gruden had trouble getting the offense in sync during his first year as Tampa Bay's head coach. In 2002, the Buccaneers ranked 25th in the league in total yards gained (5,222). Quarterback Brad Johnson made the Pro Bowl, completing 281 out of 451 passes for 3,049 yards, 22 touchdowns, and only 6 interceptions as he shared the QB position with Rob Johnson and Shaun King. Running back Michael Pittman led the team in rushing with 718 yards and one touchdown, and caught 59 passes for 477 yards. Pro Bowl fullback Mike Alstott had 548 rushing yards and 5 touchdowns, and also had 35 receptions for 242 yards and 2 touchdowns. Wide receiver Keyshawn Johnson led the team with 76 receptions for 1,088 yards and 5 touchdowns, while wide receiver Keenan McCardell had 61 receptions for 670 yards and 6 touchdowns.

However, the Buccaneers' defense was still the strength of the team, leading the NFL in total defense (252.8 yards per game), pass defense (155.6 yards per game), points allowed (12.3 points per game), passing touchdowns allowed (10), interceptions (31), and opponent passer rating (48.4). Brooks, Lynch, Sapp, and defensive end Simeon Rice all had Pro Bowl years. Brooks led the team with 87 tackles and excelled at pass coverage, recording 5 interceptions, 218 return yards, and 2 touchdowns, plus 1 fumble return and 1 on a lateral from Sapp after a Sapp interception for a total of 4 touchdowns (an NFL record for a linebacker). The defense as a whole had nine total touchdowns during the regular season and playoffs. Rice led the team with 15.5 sacks. Sapp recorded 7.5 sacks and 2 interceptions. Cornerback Brian Kelly was also a big asset, leading the team with 8 interceptions.

Raiders win without Gruden

As a result of Gruden's departure, Raiders offensive coordinator Bill Callahan was promoted to head coach. Despite the loss of Gruden in 2002, the Raiders still managed to earn a share of the AFC's best record at 11–5. The offense led the league in total passing yards (4,689) and ranked second in total yards gained (6,451).

Gannon had a MVP season, completing 418 out of 618 passes for 4,689 yards, 26 touchdowns, and with 10 interceptions. His 418 completions and his 10 games with over 300 passing yards were both NFL records. He also ran 50 times for 156 yards and 3 touchdowns. Rice, who was already the NFL's all-time leader in nearly every receiving record after 17 seasons, had a Pro Bowl season for the 13th time in his career with 92 receptions for 1,211 yards and 7 touchdowns. Gannon's other weapons in passing game were 15-year veteran receiver Tim Brown (81 receptions for 930 yards and 2 touchdowns) and young receiver Jerry Porter (51 receptions for 688 yards and 9 touchdowns). Multi-talented running back Charlie Garner was the team's leading rusher with 962 yards and 7 touchdowns, while also leading all NFL running backs in receiving with 91 receptions for 941 yards and another 4 touchdowns. Running back Tyrone Wheatley was also a big contributor with 419 rushing yards and 71 receiving yards, while fullback Zack Crockett provided both of them with solid blocking and scored 8 touchdowns. Up front, their offensive line was led by 2 Pro Bowlers, guard Lincoln Kennedy and center Barret Robbins.

The Raiders' weakness was primarily on their defense, which ranked 25th in the league in passing yards allowed (3,787) and 12th in total yards (5,240). But veteran Pro Bowl safety Rod Woodson recorded 8 interceptions (which led the league) for 225 yards and 2 touchdowns. Up front, their line was anchored by defensive tackle Rod Coleman, who led the team with 11 sacks. Behind him, the team had a solid veteran linebacker, Bill Romanowski, who was playing in his 5th Super Bowl (after winning 2 championships with the San Francisco 49ers in Super Bowls XXIII and XXIV, and 2 while playing for the Denver Broncos in Super Bowls XXXII and XXXIII). Defensive back Tory James was also a big contributor with 4 interceptions.

Playoffs

The second-seeded Buccaneers defeated the fourth-seeded San Francisco 49ers, 31–6, and the top-seeded Philadelphia Eagles on the road, 27–10, in the playoffs, to make the Super Bowl for the first time in franchise history.  Meanwhile, the top-seeded Raiders were victorious against the fourth-seeded New York Jets, 30–10, and the second-seeded Tennessee Titans, 41–24. The Raiders won against the Titans through Gannon's pass-oriented offense.

Super Bowl pregame news
The Raiders entered the game favored to win in their first Super Bowl in 19 years. They were also the first franchise to appear in the Super Bowl in four decades (1960s, 1970s, 1980s, 2000s; the 1990s was the only decade that they did not appear in the Super Bowl). However, much of the media hype surrounded the Gruden trade prior to the season. This forced league commissioner Paul Tagliabue to issue a statement that he might ban all future trades for coaches involving draft choices because it might compromise the draft.

A distraction for the Raiders was that starting center Barret Robbins went missing for most of the day before the Super Bowl. Hours before the game, he was admitted to a San Diego hospital, then spent time in rehab at the Betty Ford Clinic. He was subsequently diagnosed with bipolar disorder; it turned out that his disappearance was due to a manic episode.  Robbins later said he had gone across the border and spent his missing time partying in Tijuana, Mexico, so disoriented that he thought the Raiders had already won the game and he was celebrating the victory. Backup Adam Treu (a former Pro Bowl-er) replaced Robbins.

The Buccaneers, as the designated home team, wore red jerseys and pewter pants. The kit is normally used at home for the second half of the season; the Buccaneers wear white at home during the first half due to the late summer-early autumn heat. The Raiders donned white jerseys with silver pants, the same combination they wore in Super Bowls XI and XV (both victories).

Broadcasting
The game was broadcast in the United States by ABC with Al Michaels handling the play-by-play duties and color commentator John Madden, who became the first person to announce Super Bowls on different networks in consecutive years, having called Super Bowl XXXVI on Fox and then moving to ABC after Pat Summerall retired.

The NFC improved to 6–0 on Super Bowls broadcast on ABC. Melissa Stark and Lynn Swann served as sideline reporters. Chris Berman from Disney-owned corporate sibling ESPN hosted all the events. Berman was joined by fellow ESPN analyst Steve Young, Baltimore Ravens head coach Brian Billick, and New York Giants defensive end Michael Strahan.

The Super Bowl was the first of three major professional sports championship series ABC broadcast in 2003, as they would also broadcast the Stanley Cup Finals and the NBA Finals. Both the Super Bowl and the Stanley Cup Finals were hosted by Berman (who co-hosted the Stanley Cup Finals with John Saunders) and took place in California. The state of California had representation in both finals series. ABC’s lead NHL voice Gary Thorne mentioned all of these when he called the Stanley Cup Finals.

Memorable television commercials that aired during the game included the "Terry Tate: Office Linebacker" Reebok ad and the Budweiser Zebra Referee. ADBOWL ranked FedEx's "Castaway" as the best commercial of the year.

Following its postgame coverage, ABC aired an episode of Alias titled "Phase One", then, after a break for late local news, premiered its new late night talk show Jimmy Kimmel Live!.

NBC provided counter-programming against the halftime show, airing a live segment of "Weekend Update" from the comedy–variety show Saturday Night Live featuring Jimmy Fallon and Tina Fey.

On the radio side, the game was carried nationally by Westwood One. Marv Albert, in his first season as the network’s lead NFL voice, called the game with Boomer Esiason as his analyst. John Dockery and Warren Moon reported from the field. 

Locally, the Raiders’ broadcast was carried by their then-flagship KSFO (AM) with Greg Papa as lead announcer and Tom Flores as analyst. The Buccaneers’ then-flagship WDAE carried their broadcast, with Gene Deckerhoff as lead announcer and Scot Brantley as analyst.

Entertainment

Pre-game ceremonies
A pre-game concert featured a performance by Carlos Santana with guests Beyoncé and Michelle Branch. During its pre-game show, ABC also aired a pre-game concert outside of the stadium, which featured Bonnie Raitt, Goo Goo Dolls and Michael Bublé. French-Canadian singer Celine Dion performed "God Bless America", while country group The Dixie Chicks performed the national anthem.

As the New England Patriots' did the previous year, both teams were introduced and entered as a team rather than individually by offensive and defensive starters, establishing this as the new standard practice. To honor the 30th anniversary of the 17–0 undefeated, perfect season of the 1972 Miami Dolphins, the following members of that team appeared during the coin toss ceremony: Don Shula, Bob Griese, Larry Csonka, Larry Little, Jim Langer, Nick Buoniconti, Paul Warfield.

Halftime show

The Super Bowl XXXVII halftime show was headlined by Shania Twain, No Doubt, and Sting.

Post-game ceremonies
Bon Jovi appeared as part of the post-game ceremonies, performing "It's My Life" prior to the Vince Lombardi Trophy presentation and "Everyday" afterwards (most of the latter performance was not shown on ABC because the network cut to commercials).

Game summary

First quarter
The Raiders had a great chance to score a touchdown early in the game after cornerback Charles Woodson intercepted Buccaneers quarterback Brad Johnson's pass on the third play of the game and returned it 12 yards to the Tampa Bay 36-yard line. However, six plays later, Tampa Bay defensive end Simeon Rice sacked Raiders quarterback Rich Gannon on third down, forcing Oakland to settle for kicker Sebastian Janikowski's 40-yard field goal to give them a 3–0 lead.

Buccaneers kick returner Aaron Stecker returned the ensuing kickoff 27 yards to the 29-yard line, then appeared to fumble the ball. Although the officials initially ruled that the ball was recovered by Oakland's Eric Johnson, the play was reviewed by instant replay and the fumble was overturned, and thus Tampa Bay retained possession. It showed that both of Stecker's knees were down and the ball didn't come loose until it hit the ground. Gruden and Stecker appeared upset at having to use a challenge so early in a game, when they both believed Stecker was clearly down.

On the first play of the drive, Brad Johnson completed an 11-yard pass to wide receiver Joe Jurevicius. Johnson's next 2 passes were incomplete, but he then completed a 23-yard pass to Jurevicius on third down to advance the ball to the Oakland 37-yard line. Running back Michael Pittman then rushed for a 23-yard gain to the 13-yard line. However, on the next 3 plays, the Raiders defense limited the Buccaneers to a pair of incompletions and a 1-yard run. Argentine kicker Martín Gramática then made a 31-yard field goal to tie the game, 3–3. Later in the quarter, a 17-yard punt return by Raiders defensive back Darrien Gordon gave Oakland the ball at their own 49-yard line. Gannon then threw an 8-yard pass to running back Charlie Garner to reach the Tampa Bay 43-yard line. However, on third down, Buccaneers safety Dexter Jackson intercepted Gannon's pass at the 40-yard line and returned it 9-yards to near midfield.

Second quarter
Nine plays after the turnover, Gramática kicked his second field goal from 43 yards to give Tampa Bay a 6–3 lead.

Jackson intercepted another pass on the Raiders' next drive and returned it 25 yards to Oakland's 45-yard line, making Jackson the first player ever to record two interceptions in the first half of the Super Bowl. However, the Buccaneers were unable to take advantage of the turnover and were forced to punt. Tampa Bay got a big assist from their punter Tom Tupa, who managed to pin Oakland all the way back at their own 11-yard line. The Raiders could not move the ball either, losing 1 yard on 3 plays with their ensuing drive. Tampa Bay punt returner Karl Williams then returned Shane Lechler's punt 25 yards, giving the Buccaneers great field position at Oakland's 27-yard line. Aided with Pittman's gains of 6 and 19 yards, the Buccaneers scored their first touchdown on a 2-yard run from fullback Mike Alstott, increasing their lead to 13–3. Then with 3:45 left in the half, Tampa Bay drove 77 yards, assisted by a pair of catches by Alstott for 28 total yards. Johnson finished the drive with a 5-yard touchdown pass to wide receiver Keenan McCardell to give the Buccaneers a 20–3 halftime lead.

Third quarter
Tampa Bay continued to dominate the game for most of the third quarter. The Buccaneers forced the Raiders to punt on the opening drive of the second half. Next, Tampa Bay marched 89 yards on a 14-play drive that took 7:52 off the clock, and ended with Johnson's 8-yard touchdown pass to McCardell to increase their lead to 27–3. Then on the second play of Oakland's ensuing drive, Buccaneers defensive back Dwight Smith intercepted Gannon's pass and returned it 44 yards for a touchdown, making the score 34–3.

After giving up 34 consecutive points, Oakland finally managed to drive 82 yards down the field and score on a 39-yard touchdown pass from Gannon to wide receiver Jerry Porter. Although he was initially ruled as being out of bounds when he caught the ball, it was determined that Porter had both feet in the end zone.  The two-point conversion failed, so the Raiders were still down 34–9.

Fourth quarter
The Raiders' touchdown seemed to fire up their defense, who forced the Buccaneers to a fourth down on their ensuing possession. Oakland linebacker Tim Johnson then blocked Tupa's punt, and linebacker Eric Johnson returned the ball 13 yards for a touchdown. Another two-point conversion for Oakland failed, but Tampa Bay's lead was cut to 34–15.

Tampa Bay responded by moving the ball to the Oakland 9-yard line on their ensuing drive, featuring a 24-yard run by Pittman, but they came up empty after Tupa fumbled the snap on a field goal attempt. A few plays later, Gannon threw a 48-yard touchdown pass to wide receiver Jerry Rice with 6:06 left in the game, cutting the Raiders deficit to 34–21 and were only two touchdowns away from taking the lead. The two-point conversion failed when Jerry Porter caught the ball but landed out of bounds. Though there was contact with a defender, the officials deemed the contact incidental rather than a force-out, and therefore that part of the play was non-reviewable.

In an attempt to prevent a Raiders comeback, the Buccaneers managed to run the clock down to 2:44 on their ensuing drive before being forced to punt. Then on third and 18 from the Oakland 29-yard line, Tampa Bay linebacker Derrick Brooks put the game completely out of reach by intercepting a Gannon pass intended for Marcus Knight and returned it 44 yards for a touchdown, giving the Buccaneers a 41–21 lead with only 1:18 left, and leading Buccaneers radio announcer Gene Deckerhoff to make his famous call of "The dagger's in, we're gonna win the Super Bowl!". A few plays later, with the Raiders now playing for pride, Dwight Smith intercepted a tipped pass and returned it 50 yards for a touchdown with only two seconds remaining. Gramática kicked the extra point, and the Buccaneers were up 48–21. Raiders defensive tackle Chris Cooper returned Gramática's kickoff 6 yards before being tackled by Jack Golden, ending the game. The Buccaneers won their first-ever Super Bowl with a 48–21 victory.  Gannon said after the game that his performance was "nightmarish". With the win, Jon Gruden became, at 39, the youngest head coach to win a Super Bowl, surpassing John Madden who won Super Bowl XI at the age of 40.

Box score

Statistical overview
Tampa Bay dominated Oakland, out-gaining them in total yards (365–269), rushing yards (150–19), first downs (24–11), offensive plays (76–60), and forced turnovers (5–1). As many sports fans and writers predicted, Gruden's prior knowledge of the Raiders was a major factor. The most damaging piece of evidence is NFL Films footage of Tampa Bay defensive back John Lynch telling his teammates during the game that almost all of the plays ran by Oakland's offense were plays that Gruden (who that week even played the part of "Rich Gannon" by playing quarterback with the scout-team offense) specifically told them to look out for. Better still for the Buccaneers was that Oakland hadn't changed their audible-calling signals that Gruden himself had installed, thus tipping off plays repeatedly.

Johnson finished the game with 18 out of 34 completions for 215 yards and 2 touchdowns, with 1 interception, along with 10 rushing yards. Pittman was the top rusher of the game with 129 yards. Alstott was the game's second leading rusher with 15 yards and a touchdown, and had 5 receptions for 43 yards. Joe Jurevicius was the game's leading receiver with 4 receptions for 78 yards. Keyshawn Johnson recorded 6 catches for 69 yards. Smith recorded 2 interceptions, 94 return yards, and 2 touchdowns. He also added another 23 yards on a kickoff return.

Gannon finished the game 24 out of 44 for 272 yards and 2 touchdowns, but was intercepted a Super Bowl record 5 times. Garner was their leading rusher, but with only 10 yards, and caught 7 passes for 51 yards. Rice was the Raiders' leading receiver of the game with 5 catches for 77 yards and a touchdown. He became the first player to score touchdowns with two teams in Super Bowls (Ricky Proehl, Rob Gronkowski, and Muhsin Muhammad have since joined him). Wide receiver Marcus Knight returned 8 kickoffs for 143 yards.

Jerry Rice and Bill Romanowski joined Gene Upshaw as the only players to appear in Super Bowls in three decades. Rice played in Super Bowls XXIII, XXIV, and XXIX. Romanowski played in Super Bowls XXIII, XXIV, XXXII, and XXXIII; the Raiders' loss prevented Romanowski from joining Charles Haley as the only NFL players at that time to earn 5 Super Bowl rings (Haley was also with the 49ers for Super Bowls XXIII and XXIV, and later earned rings when the Dallas Cowboys won Super Bowls XXVII, XXVIII, and XXX). The Raiders became the first team to appear in Super Bowls under four head coaches. John Rauch coached them in Super Bowl II, John Madden (who himself called Super Bowl XXXVII on ABC), coached them in Super Bowl XI and Tom Flores coached them in Super Bowl XV and XVIII.

The teams combined for the most second half points in a Super Bowl with 46 (28 for Tampa Bay and 18 for Oakland) and the third most total points in a game with 69, tying Dallas and Buffalo who combined for 69 points in Super Bowl XXVII.

Final statistics
Sources:  NFL.com Super Bowl XXXVII, Super Bowl XXXVII Play Finder TB, Super Bowl XXXVII Play Finder Oak, Super Bowl XXXVII Play by Play

Statistical comparison

Individual leaders

1Completions/attempts
2Carries
3Long gain
4Receptions
5Times targeted

Starting lineups
Source:

Post-game riots
In Oakland, after the Raiders' loss, riots broke out on the streets of East Oakland. Twelve cars were set on fire and 400 police officers were sent to the streets.

Aftermath
The Tampa Tribune published a book by several staff writers called Pewter Power about the Buccaneers' winning season.

Both teams entered a period of decline after the Super Bowl that saw them enter lengthy playoff droughts. Furthermore, Tampa Bay finished 5–11 in 2004, becoming the first Super Bowl winning team to follow up with consecutive losing seasons. The Buccaneers had only two subsequent postseason appearances in 2005 and 2007 and did not win another playoff game until their Super Bowl-winning season in 2020. The Raiders went 14 seasons without a winning record or playoff appearance, not obtaining either again until 2016, and have not won a playoff game since this season. The 2002 season also marked the Raiders' final postseason victory in Oakland following their relocation to Las Vegas in 2020.

In January 2013, retired Raiders receiver Tim Brown accused coach Bill Callahan of deliberately throwing the game, stating that Callahan originally planned the Raiders' strategy around running the ball, since Oakland's offensive line outweighed Tampa Bay's defensive line by a significant amount.  However, Brown claimed Callahan changed the game plan to a more pass-heavy strategy two days before the game.  While Brown stopped short of saying he was sure Callahan ruined their game plan on purpose, he said, "But the facts are what they are, that less than 36 hours before the game we changed our game plan.  And we go into that game absolutely knowing that we have no shot.  That the only shot we had if Tampa Bay didn’t show up.”  Brown also suggested the change contributed to Barret Robbins' mental breakdown, saying “Barret Robbins begged Coach Callahan, ‘Do not do this to me.  I don’t have time to make my calls, to get my calls ready.  You can’t do this to me on Friday.  We haven’t practiced full speed, we can’t get this done.  I’m not saying one had anything to do with the other.  All I’m saying is those are the facts of what happened Super Bowl week.  So our ire wasn’t towards Barret Robbins, it was towards Bill Callahan.  Because we feel as if he wouldn’t have did what he did, then Barret wouldn’t have done what he did."

Jerry Rice echoed Brown's concerns, saying "For some reason - and I don't know why - Bill Callahan did not like me." "In a way, maybe because he didn't like the Raiders, he decided, ‘Maybe we should sabotage this a little bit and let Jon Gruden go out and win this one." Raiders linebacker Bill Romanowski disagreed, calling Brown's accusations "delusional".

"I am shocked, saddened and outraged by Tim Brown's allegations and Jerry Rice's support of those allegations," Callahan replied. "To leave no doubt, I categorically and unequivocally deny the sum and substance of their allegation. To suggest otherwise, especially at this time when it involves the Super Bowl, is ludicrous and defamatory.  Any suggestion that I would undermine the integrity of the sport that I love and dedicated my life to, or dishonor the commitment I made to our players, coaches and fans, is flat out wrong. I think it would be in the best interests of all including the game America loves that these allegations be retracted immediately."

Officials
Referee: Bill Carollo #63 second Super Bowl (XXXI as side judge)
Umpire: Ed Coukart #71 second Super Bowl (originally alternate for XXXII, but entered game when Jim Quirk was injured)
Head Linesman: Dale Williams #8 third Super Bowl (XX, XXVI)
Line Judge: Mark Steinkerchner #84 first Super Bowl
Side Judge: Rick Patterson #15 first Super Bowl
Field Judge: Tom Sifferman #118 first Super Bowl
Back Judge: Don Carey #126 first Super Bowl
Replay Official: Rex Stuart
Video Operator: Mike Wimmer

Notes and references

External links
 
 Super Bowl official website
 Play-by-play on USAToday.com

 The Sporting News: History of the Super Bowl (Last accessed December 4, 2005)
 https://www.pro-football-reference.com – Large online database of NFL data and statistics
 Super Bowl play-by-plays from USA Today (Last accessed September 28, 2005)

Oakland Raiders postseason
Super Bowl 037
Tampa Bay Buccaneers postseason
2002 National Football League season
2003 in American football
American football in San Diego
2003 in sports in California
2000s in San Diego
Sports competitions in San Diego
January 2003 sports events in the United States
2003 in American sports